Sitangkai, officially the Municipality of Sitangkai,  is a 1st class municipality in the province of Tawi-Tawi, Philippines. According to the 2020 census, it has a population of 37,319 people.

It is the southernmost place in the Philippines and is very close to Malaysia and Indonesia.

It is called the "Venice of the Philippines" due to the use of boats as primary transportation, although footbridges connect one house to another. The major sources of livelihood are fishing and farming, although there is very sparse agricultural land available.

History

The historical Sitangkai group of islands comprises the islands, areas, and barangays of the present Sitangkai and Sibutu municipalities. The islands had been at the crossroads of the sea trade route and were a traditional enclave of the Bajau and Sama people who for centuries had peacefully lived off fishing and trading. The Kadatuan and Kasalipan (Salip/ arabic; Sharif) of Sitangkai and Sibutu were descended from the royalties of Sulu, Sabah, and Sarawak. Historical personalities such as the Datu Iskandar of Sibutu and the Datu Halon of Sitangkai was descended from the Datu Baginda Putih, Datu Baginda Hitam, and the feared Datu Kurunding of Lahat Datu from Borneo (now part of the Malaysian and Indonesian states). In the early 1900s, a man named Lailuddin ibn Jalaluddin from the area of Nunukan, Parang, Sulu was noted to be the first Tausūg to settle in Sitangkai, bringing with him his clan, wealth, and slaves. Together with his sons and nephews, they settled, intermarried, and made alliances with the local traditional leaders and inhabitants. During World War II, Sitangkai and Sibutu, being closer to British Borneo, was targeted by patrols and occasional raids by Japanese Imperial soldiers. Sitangkai nowadays is still a jump off port for traditional traders from Sulu, Zamboanga, mainland Tawi-Tawi going to Sabah and Borneo.

Twenty municipal districts of the then-undivided Sulu, including Sitangkai, were converted into municipalities effective "as of July 1, 1958", by virtue of Executive Order No. 355 issued by President Carlos P. Garcia on August 26, 1959. On October 21, 2006, with the ratification of Muslim Mindanao Autonomy Act No. 197, 16 of its 25 barangays were transferred to the newly created municipality of Sibutu, all of which were located on Sibutu Island. Most of the residents of present-day Sitangkai are settlers from Sulu, Zamboanga, and the Visayas, brought and registered over the years by subsequent competing politicians to add votes for elections. This unjust settling policy has continued unabated over the past decades, destroying the natural demographics of Sitangkai and adjoining islands, thereby affecting the natural resources of the area and disenfranchising the original peaceful Bajau and Sama inhabitants who moved to Zamboanga or Sabah, Malaysia or fled to far away pondohans (shallow sandbars). Lack of opportunities, facilities, the proliferation of illegal arms, drug addiction, and piracy are problems facing Sitangkai today.

Geography

Barangays
Sitangkai is politically subdivided into 9 barangays. 
 Datu Baguinda Putih
 Imam Sapie
 North Larap
 Panglima Alari
 Sipangkot
 Sitangkai Poblacion
 South Larap (Larap)
 Tongmageng
 Tongusong

Climate
Sitangkai has a tropical rainforest climate (Af) with heavy rainfall year-round.

Demographics

Economy 
Sitangkai is often referred to as the Venice of the Philippines with boats being the primary mode of transportation within the town. Its location as the most southernmost town in the Philippines makes the town as a trading port for transporting goods to and from neighboring Malaysia.

Healthcare
As of 2021, there is no hospital in Sitangkai.

References

External links
 Sitangkai Profile at PhilAtlas.com
 [ Philippine Standard Geographic Code]
 Sitangkai Profile at the DTI Cities and Municipalities Competitive Index
 Philippine Census Information

Municipalities of Tawi-Tawi
Island municipalities in the Philippines
Establishments by Philippine executive order